Francis Grayson (2 September 1849 – 27 July 1927) was a shopkeeper and member of the Queensland Legislative Assembly.

Biography
Grayson was born at Lurgan, County Armagh, to parents John Grayson and his wife Jane (née Irwin) and educated at the  Church of England School in Lurgan. He left Ireland at age fourteen to come to Australia, arriving in Brisbane in 1864. Almost immediately he set out for the Darling Downs and began work at Glengallan Station which at the time was owned by the Deuchar family.

In 1870 he took up a selection of his own and named it Silverwood. After five years there he moved to Warwick where he opened a general and produce store which successfully operated for the next 27 years.

In 1872, Grayson married Jane Bell and together had two sons and four daughters. He died in 1927 after suffering a short illness and was buried in the Warwick General Cemetery.

Political career
Grayson became an alderman on the Warwick Town Council in 1879 and, except for a three-year break was on the council until 1905. He was Mayor on three occasions - 1892, 1896, and 1904.

At the 1904 state elections, standing as a Ministerialist, Grayson defeated the sitting member, Duncan Watson for the seat of Cunningham in the Queensland Legislative Assembly. He was later a member of successive parties the Kidstonites, the Liberals, the National Party, and ended up as an Independent. He retired from his seat at the 1920 state elections.

References

Members of the Queensland Legislative Assembly
1849 births
1927 deaths
National Party (Queensland, 1917) members of the Parliament of Queensland